The Italian language in the Italian Switzerland or Swiss Italian is the variety of the Italian language taught in the Italian-speaking area of Switzerland. While this variety is mainly spoken in the canton of Ticino and in the southern part of Graubünden (Canton Grigioni)  (about 270,000 native speakers), Italian is spoken natively in the whole country by about 700,000 people: Swiss Italians, Italian immigrants and Swiss citizens with Italian citizenship.

Characteristics
The presence of calques from French and German means that there are some differences in vocabulary between the standard registers of the Italian language used in Italy and Switzerland. An example would be the words for driving licence: in Italy, it is called a patente di guida but in Swiss Italian, it becomes licenza di condurre, from the French permis de conduire. Another example is the interurban bus: in Italy  it would be autobus or corriera but in Switzerland, it is the Autopostale or posta since nearly all interurban lines are run by a subsidiary of the Swiss Post.

Another notable difference is the use of the word germanico to refer to German people, instead of tedesco. However, as in Italy, the word tedesco is used to refer to the German language. In Italy, the word germanico is used in the same sense as the word "Germanic" in English, referring, for example, to Germanic languages in general.  
 
Radiotelevisione Svizzera di lingua Italiana is the main Swiss public broadcasting network in the Italian speaking regions of Switzerland. The University of Lugano is the major university of the Italian speaking part of Switzerland.

There are almost no vocal differences between Swiss Italian and mainland Italian.

Examples
Some examples of Ticinese words that are different from Italian are:

As may be seen from this table, as well as the case with the driving licence described above, Swiss Italian has fewer false friends with English than standard Italian does, as calques from French in Swiss Italian match Latin-origin words in English more often than the Standard Italian words do.

See also
Languages of Switzerland
Italian immigration to Switzerland
Italy–Switzerland relations
Swiss French
Swiss German
Swiss Standard German
Ticinese dialect

References

External links
 Dizionario dell'italiano ticinese, grigionese e "federale"

Languages of Switzerland
Dialects of Italian
Switzerland
Italian language